Antoninho is a nickname, a diminute for Antonio in Portuguese. It may refer to:

 Antoninho (name)
 Antoninho (footballer, born 1921), Antônio Fernandes (1921–1973), Brazilian football midfielder and manager
 Antoninho (footballer, born 1939), Benedicto Antonio Angeli (1931–2021), Brazilian football forward and manager